The TR-1700 (Santa Cruz) is a class of diesel-electric patrol submarines built by Thyssen Nordseewerke for the Argentine Navy in the 1980s, with two submarines completed. These ships are amongst the largest submarines built in Germany since World War II and are among the fastest diesel-electric submarines in the world. ARA San Juan was lost on 17 November 2017, leaving ARA Santa Cruz as the only remaining submarine of this class. As of 2020, the refit of Santa Cruz has been reported cancelled leaving the entire class inactive.

Development 

The original 1977 plan called for six boats, two TR-1700s built in Germany by Thyssen Nordseewerke, two in Argentina by Astillero Domecq Garcia, and two smaller TR-1400s also built in Argentina.  The final agreement in 1982 was modified to six TR-1700s, with the last four to be built in Argentina.

The TR-1700s to be built in Argentina were considered for an upgrade to a nuclear submarine. The use of INVAP's CAREM reactor for that purpose is an 'urban myth,' as such design is inadequate for moving platforms. The nuclear submarine project never came to fruition, despite later attempts to revive it.

The reasons why INVAP's reactor is inviable stem from a number of reasons. The main reasons are:

 The reactor was not designed from scratch for moving platforms and relies on the naïve and dangerous concept of "one reactor fits all purposes".
 The design has not considered the dynamic and operational characteristics of the porting platform. This causes problems in the following areas:
 Thermal problems due to the large diameter of the pellets (7.6mm), which do not allow sudden power ramps, required in a submarine.
 Wrong type of control rod mechanisms, not adequate for a rolling and pitching vessel. For example, nut-shell control rods would be more appropriate.
 The continuous movement of the large liquid free-surface inside the reactor, as experienced in vessels of any type (surface or submerged), leave fuel unexposed and, thus, not refrigerated.
 Steam generators located inside the reactor vessel (instead of outside) increase the diameter of the vessel and thus its weight, unnecessarily, restricting the operational characteristics of the submarine.
 Inconvenient coupling of various variables due to auto-pressurization.
 Lack of land prototype on a moving platform (not static). See figure to the right for a Westinghouse prototype for submarines.  
 Numerical simulations for untested designs are not enough, and are only the first step in a series of validations that have to agree with actual experiments. Before offering a reactor as a proposal, any contractor—at their own expense—should perform experiments on moving platforms (water tanks excited to reproduce ship movements) located on land, and demonstrate that they work and agree with the numerical simulations. The reactor should be identical to the reactor proposed to be fitted in a ship or submarine.

Design 
The TR-1700 submarine was designed by Thyssen and its features include high underwater speed, endurance (for a diesel submarine), and survivability. Eight 120-cell batteries are installed on each boat. Normal endurance of these boats is 30 days with an extended range up to 70 days. These boats are equipped to accept a Deep Submergence Rescue Vehicle (DSRV). Armaments include six bow  torpedo tubes and 22 SST (Special Surface Target) or Mark 37 torpedoes. The automatic torpedo reload system can reload the tubes in 50 seconds.

Thyssen proposed the TR1700A for the Australian  program. The proposed design had a reworked pressure hull, was six meters longer, and half a meter wider than the TR-1700s built for Argentina. It lost to the Type 471 from Kockums, an enlarged .

Service 
The first two submarines were delivered on schedule in 1984–85. The remaining four built in Argentina were suspended due to the Argentinean economic crisis of the 1980s. In 1996 work completely ceased on ARA Santa Fe at 70% (or 52%) completion while ARA Santiago del Estero was only 30% complete.  After attempts to complete and sell the boats to Taiwan failed, they were cannibalized, along with the parts for the fifth and sixth units, to support the continued operations of the first two submarines.

Santa Cruz received its mid-life modernization at Arsenal de Marinha, Rio de Janeiro Brazil between September 1999 and 2001.  The work involved the replacement of the engines, batteries, and sonar.  Her sister boat San Juan entered the Astillero Domecq Garcia shipyard to receive her refit in 2007; she completed refit in 2013.

In September 2010, it was revealed that the Ministry of Defense was conducting feasibility studies to decide if ARA Santa Fe (S-43) should be completed. The decision should be made sometime after completing the mid-life modernization of ARA San Juan (S-42). The estimated cost of completing Santa Fe was $60 million.

On 17 November 2017, the ARA San Juan was reported missing; reports of a fire at the time were denied by the Argentine Navy.
A year after that, on 17 November 2018, private company Ocean Infinity (appointed by the Argentine Government) announced that they successfully located the wreck, at 900 metres depth and 500 km from Comodoro Rivadavia.

Boats in class

Gallery

See also 
 List of submarine classes in service
 
 Type 209 submarine
 Type 214 submarine

References

Citations

Sources 

 Conway's All the World's Fighting Ships 1947–1995.

Further reading

External links
Santa Cruz-class patrol submarine
Submarino de ataque (SSK) classe Santa Cruz / TR-1700
Classe TR-1700

 
Submarines of Germany
Submarine classes